Dallspira is a genus of sea snails, marine gastropod mollusks in the family Pseudomelatomidae.

It was previously considered a subgenus of Crassispira

Species
Species within the genus Dallspira include:
 Dallspira dalli Bartsch, 1950
Species brought into synonymy
 Dallspira abdera (W.H. Dall, 1919)
 Dallspira lowei "Watson, R.B." Bartsch, P., 1950

All these synonyms are considered by WoRMS as synonyms of Crassispira abdera (W.H.Dall, 1919)

References

 P. Bartsch (1950), New West American Turrids. Nautilus, 63 (3): 87-97, plate 6

External links
 
 Bouchet, P.; Kantor, Y. I.; Sysoev, A.; Puillandre, N. (2011). A new operational classification of the Conoidea (Gastropoda). Journal of Molluscan Studies. 77(3): 273-308

 
Monotypic gastropod genera